Daniec  is a village in the administrative district of Gmina Chrząstowice, within Opole County, Opole Voivodeship, in south-western Poland.

The village has a population of 1,400.

References

Daniec